Mount Pleasant is a city in the U.S. state of Michigan.  Located in Central Michigan, the city is the county seat of Isabella County. The population was 21,688 as of the 2020 United States census. It is surrounded by Union Township but is politically independent.

Part of the city (with a population of 8,741) is located within the Isabella Indian Reservation, the base of the federally recognized Saginaw Chippewa Tribal Nation. The tribe's Soaring Eagle Casino & Resort in nearby Chippewa Township is also within the reservation boundaries.

The city is home to the main campuses of Central Michigan University, one of the largest universities in the state with 20,000 students at Mount Pleasant, and Mid Michigan Community College. The student population nearly doubles the population of the city during the academic year, making it a college town. Despite its name, the surrounding area is mostly flat and does not feature any mountains or hills.

History

Until the mid-19th century, this area was occupied by historical bands of the Ojibwa people, known by English speakers as the Chippewa. In the early decades of the century, they ceded vast amounts of land to the United States government, which wanted to enable settlement by European Americans.

The federal Graduation Act of 1854 allowed settlers to purchase land from the government at discount rates, and the first white settlers began to arrive in what became Mount Pleasant. Under the Treaty of 1855, the Ojibwa bands (Saginaw Chippewa Tribal Nation) from the Saginaw, Swan Creek, and Black rivers were relocated to land in Isabella County (Isabella Indian Reservation).

Many non-natives soon moved to Mount Pleasant, predicting prosperous relations with the natives. The Homestead Act of 1862 also attracted  many new settlers to Mount Pleasant, including new European immigrants, They worked to develop their stake on free lands offered by the US government in exchange for their labor in developing it for residence and agriculture.

The village and future city developed. In 1875, a devastating fire started at the Fancher Building on the north corner of Broadway and Main streets. It moved east down Broadway, destroying several buildings. Seven years later another fire would damage buildings on the south side of Broadway.

In 1879 the first library was established in Mt. Pleasant. Known as "The Library, Literary, and Musical Association of Mount Pleasant," its first books were made up of the personal book collections of the board members.

In 1890, W.A. Jordan started Mount Pleasant Business College. Expanding in 1892, the school changed its name to Central Michigan Normal School and Business Institute, as it incorporated a curriculum of teacher training. It was the origin of what is now Central Michigan University. This is the largest campus of the state system, with 20,000 students in the 21st century.

On January 3, 1893, the U.S. government opened an Indian boarding school called the Mount Pleasant Indian Industrial Boarding School. Indian children were encouraged to give up their cultural ways and assimilate to using the English language and adopting European-American culture. The school operated for 40 years, closing in 1933.

Since the late 20th and early 21st centuries, the role of such schools has been re-evaluated and the damage done to children by such efforts has been acknowledged. Various Native American groups have taken action to help people reconcile their experiences. On July 17, 2009, the White Bison Wellbriety Journey for Forgiveness made a stop in the Mount Pleasant community to recognize this part of the city's history. The boarding school building was abandoned, but the Saginaw Chippewa Tribal Nation purchased it from the state of Michigan.

In 1928, large quantities of oil were discovered in the Mt. Pleasant area. A farm owned by the Lilly family was the first to strike, producing hundreds of barrels a day. Although oil resources eventually diminished, this legacy is represented in the Mt. Pleasant city seal, which includes an image of an oil drill. Mt. Pleasant High School's mascot, the Oiler, also refers to the city's history of oil production.

Geography
The Chippewa River runs through the city.

Climate

Demographics

2010 census
As of the census of 2010, there were 26,016 people, 8,376 households, and 3,100 families living in the city. The racial makeup of the city was 87.6% White, 3.9% African American, 2.0% Native American, 3.0% Asian, 0.6% from other races, and 2.8% from two or more races. Hispanic or Latino of any race were 3.3% of the population.

There were 8,376 households, of which 18.7% had children under the age of 18 living with them, 24.3% were married couples living together, 9.3% had a female householder with no husband present, 3.4% had a male householder with no wife present, and 63.0% were non-families. 31.6% of all households were made up of individuals, and 8.6% had someone living alone who was 65 years of age or older. The average household size was 2.35 and the average family size was 2.86.

The median age in the city was 22 years. 11% of residents were under the age of 18; 53.1% were between the ages of 18 and 24; 16.8% were from 25 to 44; 11.9% were from 45 to 64; and 7.2% were 65 years of age or older. The gender makeup of the city was 47.4% male and 52.6% female.

2000 census
As of the census of 2000, there were 25,946 people, 8,449 households, and 3,126 families living in the city. The racial makeup of the city was 89.12% White, 3.67% African American, 1.54% Native American, 2.85% Asian, 0.07% Pacific Islander, 0.93% from other races, and 1.83% from two or more races. Hispanic or Latino of any race were 2.49% of the population.

There were 8,449 households, out of which 18.8% had children under the age of 18 living with them, 25.9% were married couples living together, 8.5% had a female householder with no husband present, and 63.0% were non-families. 29.6% of all households were made up of individuals, and 8.8% had someone living alone who was 65 years of age or older.  The average household size was 2.38 and the average family size was 2.88.

In the city, the population was spread out, with 11.5% under the age of 18, 54.1% from 18 to 24, 16.9% from 25 to 44, 10.2% from 45 to 64, and 7.3% who were 65 years of age or older.  The median age was 22 years. For every 100 females, there were 82.4 males.  For every 100 females age 18 and over, there were 80.2 males.

The median income for a household in the city was $24,572, and the median income for a family was $43,927. Males had a median income of $32,004 versus $23,869 for females. The per capita income for the city was $13,177.  About 11.4% of families and 37.2% of the population (student population skews this statistic) were below the poverty line, including 14.8% of those under age 18 and 7.6% of those age 65 or over.

Transportation
 is a major north–south route connecting with Lansing and Jackson to the south and with Clare and Grayling to the north.
 is a loop route traveling through the heart of the city, connecting with US 127 at each end.
 continues east to Midland and Bay City and west toward Big Rapids.

Education
 Central Michigan University
 Mid Michigan Community College-Mount Pleasant Campus
 Saginaw Chippewa Tribal College
 Mount Pleasant Public Schools including Mount Pleasant High School
 Sacred Heart Academy, private Catholic school

Local media
Newspapers
 The Morning Sun (Daily)
 Central Michigan Life (Published Monday and Thursday during the academic year)
 The Pulse - aka Central Michigan Pulse (Weekly - Published on Thursdays)

Radio stations
 WMMI (830 AM) - Talk radio (licensed to Shepherd)
 WCMU (89.5 FM) - CMU Public Radio
 WMHW-FM (91.5 FM) - CMU College Student Radio/The Mountain (Adult Album Alternative) 
 WCEN-FM (94.5 FM) - The Moose - Country music (licensed to Hemlock; formerly located in Mount Pleasant)
 WCFX (95.3 FM) - 95-3 CFX Today's Best Music - Top 40 (licensed to Clare)
 W266BU (101.1 FM) - CMU College Student Radio/The Beat (Rhythmic Contemporary) (repeats WMHW-FM's HD2 signal)
 WCZY-FM (104.3 FM) - My 104-3 - Adult Hits

TV stations
 WCMU (Channel 14) - PBS

Notable people
 James "Gerbs" Bauer, astronomer
 Ryan Brehm, 3-time NCAA champion golfer
 Paul Carey, baseball broadcaster, Detroit Tigers
 Tom Crean, college basketball coach
Dick Enberg, sports broadcaster
 John Engler, former Governor of Michigan
 Cindy Figg-Currier, pro golfer
 William S. Hammack. engineering, youtube personality engineerguy
 Len Kasper, baseball broadcaster, Chicago Cubs
 Matt LaFleur, head coach, Green Bay Packers
 Grace McArthur, folk artist
 James E. McBryde, Michigan state legislator and salesman
 Sara Murray, CNN political correspondent
 Dan Pohl, pro golfer
 Kelly Robbins, pro golfer
 Dan Schafer, musician and songwriter
 John William Tebbel (1912–2004) was an American journalist, editor, writer, teacher, and media historian.

Sister cities
Okaya, Japan
Valdivia, Chile

References

External links
 City of Mount Pleasant Homepage
 Mount Pleasant Area Convention and Visitors Bureau
 
 

County seats in Michigan
Cities in Isabella County, Michigan
Micropolitan areas of Michigan